Gandala is  a Gram Panchayat Village and Up-Tehsil in Behror tahsil/Sub-district, Alwar , Rajasthan, India. It is the second  largest  Village by population  in Behror Tehsil after Bardod Village  according to 2011 Census of India and situated on Behror-Kund Road ( MDR -75). It is  7 km from Sub-district headquarters and 70 km from District headquarters . It is 140 km from state capital and 120 km from national capital .The village is well known for its ancient temple which is named after Sati Nihali Mata. The main occupation of people in this rural area is Agriculture.The Majority population in village mainly Yadavs. Part of Goad Village , Narnaul, Haryana.

Geography and demographics 
Latitude- 27.977853, Longitude- 76.311623

The area is generally plain with few hills of Aravalli range – Khohar hills (1990 ft)  of Aaravalli – to the north-west. The village sits near a mound which has not been excavated archaeologically. The area is agrarian and most common source of irrigation is ground water. The soil here is highly fertile and is of loamy type – Mattiyar and gives excellent produce only drawback being groundwater is salty and not fit for irrigation damaging soil – which needs to be left fallow. The crops sown are bajra, wheat, jowar, mustard, cotton, barley and gram. Pala Pula , a dwarf ber – shrub used to grow profusely in this area which was used as an excellent source of nutrition for cattle.

Economy and culture 

Agriculture is the main occupation of the villagers. Since the last decade or so Gandala has been increasingly emerging as a place noted among the surrounding villages for providing facilities for children's education, selling their produce, shopping, trade, institutional interaction, etc. Besides the Main Bazar that is just 9 km from Behror, there are a number of shop-clusters or markets specializing in merchandise such as footwear, vegetables and fruits, medicines, etc.

Services 
There are two government senior secondary schools, one primary health center and one nationalised bank - Punjab National Bank. Others - PNB ATM, Post Office, telephone exchange with all towers (BSNL, Idea, Vodafone, Reliance Communications, Tata Indicom, Aircel, etc.), Government Hospital, Pashu Hospital, government and private schools, main market, Atal Seva Kendra, Emitra Services, air water tank for water supply, electricity (24 hours), petrol pump.

References 

Villages in Alwar district